Claudia Müller (born 10 August 1981) is a German politician of the Alliance 90/The Greens who has been serving as a member of the Bundestag from the state of Mecklenburg-Vorpommern since 2017.

In addition to her parliamentary work, Müller has been serving as Parliamentary State Secretary in the  Federal Ministry of Food and Agriculture in the coalition government of Chancellor Olaf Scholz since 2022. In 2022, she was briefly the Coordinator for the Maritime Industry and Tourism at the Federal Ministry for Economic Affairs and Climate Action.

Early life and education
Müller took her Abitur at the Gymnasium am Goetheplatz in Rostock in 2002. In 1998/99 she spent a year as an exchange student in the USA. From 2002 to 2012 she studied Management Studies at the University of Applied Sciences Stralsund.

Early career
Since 2000 Müller has been working as a freelance tour guide and since 2008 as a media educational project developer for Identity Films Medienwerkstatt.

Political career

Career in state politics
From February 2012 to May 2014, Müller chaired the Green Party’s parliamentary group in the Vorpommern-Rügen regional parliament.

Member of the German Parliament, 2017–present
Müller became a member of the Bundestag in the 2017 German federal election, representing the Vorpommern-Rügen – Vorpommern-Greifswald I district. In parliament, she has since been a member of the Committee on European Affairs and the Committee on Economic Affairs and Energy. She also serves as her parliamentary group’s representative for small and medium-sized enterprises and spokesperson for maritime economy.

In addition to her committee assignments, Müller co-chairs the Parliamentary Friendship Group for Relations with the Baltic States and the Parliamentary Friendship Groups for Relations with the Nordic countries.

In the negotiations to form a so-called traffic light coalition of the Social Democratic Party (SPD), the Green Party and the Free Democratic Party (FDP) following the 2021 federal elections, Müller was part of her party's delegation in the working group on economic affairs, co-chaired by Carsten Schneider, Cem Özdemir and Michael Theurer.

In July 2022, Müller announced her intention to become her party's candidate to become mayor of Rostock; in the election, she only came in fourth with a total result of 8.6 percent of the votes.

References

External links 

  
 Bundestag biography 

1981 births
Living people
Members of the Bundestag for Mecklenburg-Western Pomerania
Female members of the Bundestag
21st-century German women politicians
Members of the Bundestag 2021–2025
Members of the Bundestag 2017–2021
Members of the Bundestag for Alliance 90/The Greens